Ann Ford (née Yeoman; born 30 March 1952) is an English former middle and long-distance runner. She finished in the top ten at five IAAF World Cross Country Championships, including fourth-place finishes in 1974 and 1976. She also won a World Cross Country Championship team gold medal in 1974 and a bronze medal in 1979 and 1982. She was also a team winner at the International Cross Country Championships in 1972.

In 1978, she won a bronze medal in the 3000 metres at the Commonwealth Games, in a race won by her twin sister Paula Fudge. At the 1988 London Marathon, she finished second to Ingrid Kristiansen, running a personal best time of 2:30:38, to earn selection for the Seoul Olympics. She withdrew from the Olympic team in August 1988 due to injury.

On the road running circuit, she was the 1986 winner of the Reading Half Marathon, the Fleet Half Marathon winner in 1985 and 1988, and won the Nottingham Half Marathon in 1993 and 1997.

International competitions

Marathons

National titles
English Cross Country Championships
Senior race: 1976
AAA Marathon Championships
Senior race: 1986, 1988
England Athletics Championships
3000 m: 1972

See also
List of Commonwealth Games medallists in athletics (women)

References

1952 births
Living people
British female long-distance runners
British female marathon runners
British female cross country runners
English female long-distance runners
English female marathon runners
English female cross country runners
Athletes (track and field) at the 1978 Commonwealth Games
Commonwealth Games medallists in athletics
Commonwealth Games bronze medallists for England
Medallists at the 1978 Commonwealth Games